Comprehensive may refer to:
Comprehensive layout, the page layout of a proposed design as initially presented by the designer to a client.
Comprehensive school, a state school that does not select its intake on the basis of academic achievement or aptitude.
Comprehensive examination, an exam taken in some countries by graduates.